The 2005 North Dakota State Bison football team represented North Dakota State University in the 2005 NCAA Division I-AA football season. The team was led by third-year head coach Craig Bohl and played their homes game at the Fargodome in Fargo, North Dakota.  The Bison finished the season with an overall record of 7–4 and tied for second place in the Great West Conference with a mark of 3–2. Despite being ranked #20 at the end of the year, North Dakota State was ineligible for the NCAA Division I-AA playoffs per NCAA rules that mandated a four-year probationary period for programs entering NCAA Division I-AA. The Bison were ranked in the top-25 in 10 of the 11 weeks in the season.

Schedule

References

North Dakota State
North Dakota State Bison football seasons
North Dakota State Bison football